Procrateria is a genus of moths of the family Noctuidae.

Species  
 Procrateria basifascia Pinhey 1968
 Procrateria malagassa Viette 1961 
 Procrateria melanoleuca Hampson 1910
 Procrateria noloides Hampson 1905
 Procrateria pterota Hampson 1909

References
Natural History Museum Lepidoptera genus database

Hadeninae